Cee is a municipality of northwestern Spain in the province of A Coruña, in the autonomous community of Galicia. It has a population of 7,712 inhabitants (INE, 2010).

Demography 
From:INE Archiv

Climate
The climate of Cee is warm in the spring and hot in the summer months of July and August, typical of the northwest coast of Galicia.

References

External links
Pictures of Cee, Galicia

Municipalities in the Province of A Coruña